Silver arsenate is an inorganic compound with the formula Ag3AsO4. It has been used in qualitative analysis to distinguish between phosphate (Ag3PO4 is yellow) and arsenate(V) solutions.

References

Silver compounds
Arsenates